The Love Wager is a 1933 British comedy film directed by A. Cyran and starring Pat Paterson, Frank Stanmore and Wallace Douglas. It was released by Paramount Pictures as a quota quickie.

Plot summary
Before he can receive her father's consent a young man works to try to earn £1,500 in a year to marry his girlfriend.

Cast
 Pat Paterson as Peggy
 Frank Stanmore as Shorty
 Wallace Douglas as Peter Neville
 Morton Selten as General Neville
 Moira Dale as Auntie Prue
 Harold Saxon-Snell as Huxter
 Hugh E. Wright as Noakes
 Philip Godfrey as Ed Grimes

References

Bibliography
 Chibnall, Steve. Quota Quickies: The Birth of the British 'B' Film. British Film Institute, 2007.
 Low, Rachael. Filmmaking in 1930s Britain. George Allen & Unwin, 1985.
 Wood, Linda. British Films, 1927-1939. British Film Institute, 1986.

External links

1933 films
1933 comedy films
British comedy films
British black-and-white films
1930s English-language films
1930s British films
Quota quickies
Paramount Pictures films